Peter K. Friz (born 1974 in Klagenfurt) is a mathematician working in the fields of partial differential equations, quantitative finance, and stochastic analysis.

Education and career
He studied at the Vienna University of Technology, Ecole Centrale Paris, University of Cambridge and Courant Institute of Mathematical Sciences (New York University), and obtained his PhD in 2004 under the supervision of S. R. Srinivasa Varadhan.

He worked as a quantitative associate at Merrill Lynch, then held academic positions at the University of Cambridge, and the Radon Institute. Since 2009, he is full professor at the Technical University of Berlin, and associated with the Weierstrass Institute for Applied Analysis and Stochastics in Berlin.

In 2010 he has been awarded an ERC Starting Grant. In 2016 he has been awarded an ERC Consolidator Grant.

Books
 with 
 with 
 with

References

External links 
 
 

21st-century German mathematicians
Living people
1974 births
Academic staff of the Technical University of Berlin
European Research Council grantees
Alumni of the University of Cambridge
Courant Institute of Mathematical Sciences alumni
TU Wien alumni
Probability theorists